The  ("Flying Leaves"; also translated as "Flying Pages" or "Loose Sheets") was a German weekly  humor and satire magazine appearing between 1845 and 1944 in Munich. Many of the illustrations were by well-known artists such as Wilhelm Busch, Count Franz Pocci, Hermann Vogel, Carl Spitzweg, Julius Klinger, Edmund Harburger, Adolf Oberländer and others. Aimed at the German bourgeoisie, it reached a maximum circulation of c.95,000 copies by 1895.

Sample illustrations

Notes

External links
 

1845 establishments in Germany
1944 disestablishments in Germany
Defunct magazines published in Germany
German-language magazines
Satirical magazines published in Germany
Magazines established in 1845
Magazines disestablished in 1944
Magazines published in Munich
Weekly magazines published in Germany